Tweedmouth Rangers Football Club is a football team in the town of Berwick-upon-Tweed, England, just south of the border with Scotland.

Founded in 2010, they currently play across the border in the East of Scotland Football League, having joined in 2016.  Prior to this, they were members of the North Northumberland League in England.

The club play at Old Shielfield Park, with a capacity of 1,000, and which the club use under an agreement with the Berwick Rangers supporters club.

References

External links
 
 
 

Berwickshire
Football clubs in Scotland
Association football clubs established in 2010
Football clubs in England
Football clubs in Northumberland
Berwick-upon-Tweed
Expatriated football clubs
2010 establishments in England
2010 establishments in Scotland
East of Scotland Football League teams
North Northumberland Football League
Football clubs in the Scottish Borders